The Viper of Milan is a 1906 historical novel by the British writer Marjorie Bowen. Written when she was sixteen it received a number of rejections from publishers before its eventual publication. It proved a bestseller and launched her on a prolific career involving many popular successes. It is set in Renaissance Italy during the fourteenth century. It portrays the relentless rivalry between Gian Galeazzo Visconti, Duke of Milan and  Mastino della Scala, a dispossessed ruler of Verona.

It was republished in 1960 with a foreword by Graham Greene.

References

Bibliography
 Vinson, James. Twentieth-Century Romance and Gothic Writers. Macmillan, 1982.

1906 British novels
1906 debut novels
Novels set in Italy
British historical novels
Novels by Marjorie Bowen
Novels set in the 14th century